Boulder Creek is a 5 mile long tributary stream of Myer Creek in Imperial County, California.

References

Rivers of Imperial County, California
Rivers of Southern California